= La Ramadita =

Coordinates: 27°38′S 67°38′W

- Municipality and town
- Interactive map of La Ramadita
- Country: Argentina
- Province: Catamarca Province
- Time zone: UTC−3 (ART)

La Ramadita is a town and municipality in Catamarca Province in northwestern Argentina.
